Henry Gordon Dietz is an American electrical engineer and currently the James F. Hardymon Chair professor in Engineering and Networking at the University of Kentucky, an endowed professorship from Textron's CEO. Dietz is also a published author.

References

University of Kentucky faculty
American electrical engineers
American science writers
New York University alumni
Purdue University faculty
Washington University in St. Louis faculty
Stevens Institute of Technology faculty